Ronnie Shanklin (January 21, 1948 – April 17, 2003) was an American professional football player who was a wide receiver for six seasons in the National Football League (NFL) with the Pittsburgh Steelers and the Chicago Bears. He also played football at the University of North Texas.

He was a member of the 1974 Steelers squad that defeated the Minnesota Vikings in Super Bowl IX.  He was also a part of the 1972 Steelers team that defeated the Oakland Raiders in the Immaculate Reception playoff game (their first post-season appearance since 1947) and the 1973 Steelers that lost to the Raiders in the first round of the playoffs.

He led all NFL receivers with a 23.7 yards per catch average in 1973.

External links 
 Steelers Team MVP Award History

1948 births
2003 deaths
People from Hubbard, Texas
American football wide receivers
North Texas Mean Green football players
Pittsburgh Steelers players
Chicago Bears players
American Conference Pro Bowl players